La Chorrera Army Airfield is a former United States Army Air Forces World War II air base on Panama.  It was a sub-base of Albrook Field and later Howard Field which used for dispersal and overflow units as part of the defense of the Panama Canal.

Units assigned to the field were:
 30th Pursuit (later Fighter) Squadron (37th Fighter Group), 24 November 1941 – 3 January 1943 (P-40 Warhawk)
 31st Pursuit (later Fighter) Squadron (37th Fighter Group), 9–23 December 1941; 3 February-19 May 1942 (P-40 Warhawk)
 24th Fighter Squadron (16th Fighter Group), 15 March–September 1942; 10Jan-28 May 1943 (P-39 Airacobra)
 28th Fighter Squadron (37th Fighter Group),26 March-2 May 1942 (P-40 Warhawk)
 15th Fighter Squadron (53d Fighter Group), 2 January-10 November 1942 (P-39 Airacobra)
 53d Fighter Squadron  (32d Fighter Group), 7 January-8 June 1943 (P-40 Warhawk)
 43d Fighter Squadron (XXVI Fighter Command), 6 April-29 August 1944 (P-39 Airacobra)

References

 Maurer, Maurer (1983). Air Force Combat Units Of World War II. Maxwell AFB, Alabama: Office of Air Force History. .

External links

Airfields of the United States Army Air Forces in Panama